John Harold 'Jack' Petchell (14 December 1904 – 10 August 1968) was an  Australian rules footballer and an Australian international lawn bowler.

Australian rules football
Petchell played with South Melbourne in the Victorian Football League (VFL) for three seasons. He subsequently played for Preston in the Victorian Football Association (VFA).

War service
Petchell served in the Australian Army during World War II.

Lawn bowls
Petchell won the 1947 singles title at the Australian National Bowls Championships when bowling for the Sturt Bowls Club.

References

External links 

Jack Petchell's playing statistics from The VFA Project

1904 births
1968 deaths
Australian rules footballers from Victoria (Australia)
Sydney Swans players
People educated at Scotch College, Melbourne
Australian male bowls players
Australian Army personnel of World War II
Australian Army officers